Ronnie Glasgow OBE was a Scotland international rugby union player.

Rugby Union career

Amateur career

He played for Dunfermline, and Gordonians, as well as Jordanhill and Haddington.

Allan Massie stated:

"It was his misfortune to play for unfashionable clubs: Jordanhill College, Gordonians and Dunfermline. I have no doubt that had he played for Hawick or Gala or one of the big city clubs he would have represented his country more often."

Provincial career

He was to represent two district sides. He played 21 times for North and Midlands and 6 times for Glasgow District.

International career

Allan Massie considers that:
"Ron Glasgow was the most under-capped Scottish forward, winning only ten caps between 1962 and 1965... Glasgow's performance at Cardiff [in 1962] alone should have ensured him of a long reign at open-side wing-forward.

Glasgow's try was the first Scottish one in Cardiff for 27 years.

Robin Lind (Harry?!) who played for Dunfermline and North and Midlands said "never, ever did I think my team would lose when Ron Glasgow played for us. And very seldom we did."

Personal life

He was the father of Cammie Glasgow, who was also capped for Scotland.

He was PE teacher at Dollar Academy and head of the school cadet force. He was appointed OBE in the 1990 New Year Honours for his service with the Territorial Army/

References

Sources

 Bath, Richard (ed.) The Scotland Rugby Miscellany (Vision Sports Publishing Ltd, 2007 )
 McLaren, Bill Talking of Rugby (1991, Stanley Paul, London )
 Massie, Allan A Portrait of Scottish Rugby (Polygon, Edinburgh)

1930 births
Living people
Scottish rugby union players
Scotland international rugby union players
Dunfermline RFC players
Gordonians RFC players
North and Midlands players
Glasgow District (rugby union) players
Rugby union flankers
Haddington RFC players
Officers of the Order of the British Empire